Mahoi Kalan is a village in Chhatarpur district, Madhya Pradesh state of India. The pin code of the village is 471525.

References

Villages in Chhatarpur district